Edward Leo Mannix was an American voice actor, author and journalist. He is mainly known for his work in dubbing films and TV shows in Rome and Los Angeles, including Caliber 9, Golgo 13: The Professional and Robotech: The Movie. He was arguably best known for being the English voice of actor Bud Spencer.

His published works include An End to Fury, A Journal of Love and The Widower. He was also a stringer for The Ring while living in Italy.

He died in Bristol, Maine, in 1995.

Selected filmography
Caliber 9 (1972) as Rocco (voice, English version)
The New York Ripper (1982) as Lt. Fred Williams (voice, English version)
1990: The Bronx Warriors (1982) as Hammer (voice, English version)
The Lonely Lady (1983) as Awards MC (only live-action role)
Golgo 13: The Professional (1983) as General T. Jefferson (voice, English version)
Castle in the Sky (1986) as Uncle Pom (voice, Streamline Pictures English version)
Robotech: The Movie (1986) (additional voices, English version, credited as Cyn Branch)
Robotech II: The Sentinels (1988) as Cabell (voice, English version, credited as Cyn Branch)

References

External links
Edward Mannix on IMDb

20th-century American male actors
20th-century American novelists
American male film actors
American male novelists
American male voice actors
20th-century American male writers
1995 deaths
People from Jersey City, New Jersey